Hypostomus affinis is a species of catfish in the family Loricariidae. It is native to South America, where it occurs in the Paraíba do Sul basin. It is typically seen in areas of varied width and flow speed, with a substrate of rocks and sand. Juveniles of the species are often seen within riparian vegetation near riverbanks. It is believed to display facultative air-breathing and asynchronous ovarian development, with oocytes of all stages being present simultaneously. H. affinis reaches 39.7 cm (15.6 inches) in standard length.

References 

affinis
Fish described in 1877